Aegila or Aigila ( or Αἴγιλα) was a town of ancient Laconia with a temple of Demeter.

It site is tentatively located at Kionia Kournou.

References

Populated places in ancient Laconia
Former populated places in Greece